Field Marshal Shree Shree Shree Maharaja Sir Juddha Shumsher Jung Bahadur Rana (19 April 1875 in Narayanhity Palace, Kathmandu – 20 November 1952 in Dehradun, India) was the Prime Minister of Nepal from 1 September 1932 to 29 November 1945 as the head of the Rana dynasty.

He was the Field marshal and Maharaja of Lamjung and Kaski. He is credited for rebuilding the Dharahara which was destroyed by the 1934 Nepal–Bihar earthquake.

Juddha Shumsher had twenty sons and twenty daughters.

Early life 
Juddha Shumsher Jung Bahadur Rana was born on 19 April 1875 at the Narayanhiti Palace in Durbar Marg, Kathmandu to Dhir Shumsher Rana and Juhar Kumari Devi. Rana was born into a noble Hindu Chhetri family, his father Dhir Shamsher, was the youngest brother of Jung Bahadur Rana who started the Rana dynasty, and his mother belonged to a noble Rajput family from Kangra. He was made colonel by Jung Bahadur during his Annaprashana ceremony which marks an infant's first intake of food other than milk. At the age of nine, his father Dhir Shumsher died, subsequently, he was looked after by his brothers. Following the 1885 Nepal coup d'état, his elder brother Bir Shumsher became the prime minister and Juddha was made a general and given an allowance of 21, 000 Nepalese rupees (NPR). At the age of 12, he was enrolled in a school, however, due to his deteriorating health, Rana had to leave his studies. During that time, he lived with Bhim Shumsher, who also performed his Upanayana ceremony. In 1888, he was married to Padma Kumari Devi of Gulmi.

Ancestors

See also
Banishment of Buddhist monks from Nepal
Juddha Barun Yantra

References

Citations 

 

1875 births
1952 deaths
Prime ministers of Nepal
Grand Croix of the Légion d'honneur
Knights Grand Cross of the Order of the Bath
Knights Grand Cross of the Order of Saints Maurice and Lazarus
Honorary Knights Grand Commander of the Order of the Star of India
Knights Grand Commander of the Order of the Indian Empire
Rana regime
Rana dynasty
20th-century prime ministers of Nepal
20th-century Nepalese nobility
19th-century Nepalese nobility
Nepalese Hindus
Monarchs who abdicated